Euphaedra eusemoides, the western mimic forester, is a butterfly in the family Nymphalidae. It is found in Guinea, Sierra Leone, Liberia, Ivory Coast and Ghana.

Description
 
E. eusemoides Sm. & Kirby (42 a). Forewing above without hindmarginal spot, the median band consisting of only two separated spots (in the cell and in cellule 2); the marginal band of the hindwing on both surfaces unspotted; the cell of the forewing beneath red at the base, both with 3 black dots; hindwing beneath spotted with light yellow in the middle (in cellules 4 and 5). Congo.

Biology
The habitat consists of wet forests.

Adults are attracted to fallen fruit.  They mimic day-flying Agaristinae and Lasiocampidae moths.

Taxonomy
It is the nominal member of the Euphaedra eusemoides species group.

References

Butterflies described in 1889
eusemoides
Butterflies of Africa
Taxa named by Henley Grose-Smith
Taxa named by William Forsell Kirby